Isaías Sánchez Cortés (born 9 February 1987), known simply as Isaías, is a professional footballer who plays as a central midfielder for Australian club Adelaide United.

He spent most of his career in Australia with Adelaide United after signing in 2013, winning several team honours.

Club career

Early years and Espanyol
Born in Sabadell, Barcelona, Catalonia, Isaías was a CF Badalona youth graduate, and started playing professionally with that club in the Segunda División B while also working as a part-time plumber. In 2010 he signed for RCD Espanyol, but spent the majority of his first year with the reserves in the Tercera División.

On 10 April 2011, Isaías made his first-team and La Liga debut, playing the last 22 minutes of a 0–0 away draw against Hércules CF. He spent the following two seasons on loan to SD Ponferradina, contributing 27 games and one goal in his second to help the side to return to Segunda División.

Adelaide United
In July 2013, Isaías signed for Adelaide United FC, penning a two-year contract. He won the Player of The Year award for his team in his debut campaign in the A-League.

Isaías scored his first goal for the club on 24 January 2015, netting from 25 meters in a 7–0 win over the Newcastle Jets FC. He repeated the feat in the 2016 A-League Grand Final in an eventual 3–1 defeat of Western Sydney Wanderers FC, through a 34th-minute free kick.

On 23 September 2017, Isaías was announced as captain at Adelaide United's season launch, taking over from Eugene Galekovic who transferred to Melbourne City FC. In January 2019, the 32-year-old became an Australian citizen. 

Isaías left Adelaide United in May 2019, in order to explore overseas opportunities.

Later career
On 4 July 2019, recently promoted Al-Wakrah SC announced on Twitter the transfer of Isaías for an undisclosed fee. The 34-year-old returned to Adelaide United on 23 August 2021, signing a three-year contract.

Style of play
Playing as a defensive midfielder for Adelaide United, Isaías can switch between defensive and offensive positions and also drops into defence, allowing the full-backs to push forward. He is known for his ability to control the pace and intensity of the game, keep possession of the ball and launch attacks when his team plays from defence to attack.

Isaías was described by Adelaide manager Josep Gombau as his "foot soldier", being a complete footballer with technique, speed and controlled aggression.

Career statistics

Honours
Adelaide United
A-League Championship: 2016
A-League Premiership: 2015–16
FFA Cup: 2014, 2018

Individual
Joe Marston Medal: 2016
A-Leagues All Star: 2022

References

External links

1987 births
Living people
Sportspeople from Sabadell
Spanish footballers
Australian soccer players
Footballers from Catalonia
Naturalised soccer players of Australia
Association football midfielders
La Liga players
Segunda División players
Segunda División B players
Tercera División players
CF Damm players
CF Badalona players
RCD Espanyol B footballers
RCD Espanyol footballers
SD Ponferradina players
A-League Men players
Adelaide United FC players
Qatar Stars League players
Al-Wakrah SC players
Spanish expatriate footballers
Expatriate soccer players in Australia
Expatriate footballers in Qatar
Spanish expatriate sportspeople in Australia
Spanish expatriate sportspeople in Qatar